Zuccari  is an Italian surname. Notable people with the name include:

 the surname of a family of notable Italian painters living in the 16th century:
 Ottaviano Zuccari and his sons
 Taddeo Zuccari (1529-1566) and
 Federico Zuccari (c. 1540-1609);

 Anna Radius Zuccari (1846–1918), Italian writer 
 Carlo Zuccari (1703-1792), Italian composer and violist
 Federigo Zuccari (1783 –1817), Italian astronomer

See also 

 Zuccari (disambiguation)
 Zuccaro